The following lists events that happened during 2008 in the Democratic Republic of the Congo.

Incumbents 
 President: Joseph Kabila
 Prime Minister: Antoine Gizenga

Events

January
Katanga Mining acquires Nikanor plc for $452 million.

February
Findings of the mining contract review announced.

 February 7: Prairie International and the Central African Mining and Exploration Company (CAMEC) announced that operations at Mukondo had restarted.

May
Cobalt production operations resume at Katanga Mining's Luilu Metallurgical Plant after an extensive restoration program.

November
Katanga Mining announced temporary suspension of mining and ore processing at the Kolwezi concentrator due to the depressed price of cobalt.

References

 
2000s in the Democratic Republic of the Congo
Years of the 21st century in the Democratic Republic of the Congo
Democratic Republic of the Congo
Democratic Republic of the Congo